Mining in the Northern Territory accounts for 16.4% of the gross domestic product, inclusive of both the minerals and petroleum industries. In 2015, it was valued at A$3,436 million. It accounts for 4.3% of the Northern Territory workforce. 63 businesses are currently engaged in the sector.

History 

Prior to European Settlement Indigenous groups mined ochre and other materials for ceremonial activities. With the arrival of the overland telegraph in the 1860s - 70's gold was discovered

Major commodities

Manganese

Manganese mining in the Northern Territory in the financial year 2013-14, was worth A$1,024 million.

Petroleum

Petroleum, like mining, falls under the jurisdiction of the Department of Mines and Energy. It was worth $214 million in 2014. The  NT onshore area is over 1.35 million km2. There were 54 active exploration permits, three retention and five productions licences. Hydrocarbons have been produced since the 1980s.

Onshore gas was produced at the Mereenie and Palm Valley gas fields in the Amadeus Basin, west of Alice Springs. The Dingo Field began producing gas in November 2015.

Gold

Gold mining in the Northern Territory was worth A$770 million in 2014.

Uranium

Uranium mining in the Northern Territory in the financial year 2013-14, was worth A$136 million.

Geothermal

There are no granted geothermal permits in the NT at the time of producing this report. The last permit was surrendered in 2014.

References

External links
 Department of Mines and Energy website

 
Economy of the Northern Territory